This is a list of all episodes in the animated TV series Æon Flux. The first two seasons are devoid of speech and purposely lack continuity, as Æon dies in every episode.

Series overview

Season 1/Pilot (1991)
Each of the six episodes in the first season was originally broadcast as a 2-minute segment of Liquid Television. On home media releases they are compiled into a single "pilot" episode.

Season 2 (1992)
Each episode of the second season was broadcast as a 5-minute segment of Liquid Television.

Season 3 (1995)
In its third and final season, Æon Flux became a standalone program with each episode given a half-hour time slot with commercials.

References

Episodes
Aeon Flux episodes, List of